Advanced Placement (AP) Spanish Language and Culture (also known as AP Spanish Language, AP Spanish V, or  AP Spanish) is a course and examination offered by the College Board in the United States education system as part of the Advanced Placement Program.

The course
This course is primarily a comprehensive review of all previous knowledge pertaining to the Spanish language.  This class builds upon the skills developed within introductory and intermediate Spanish classes by applying each skill to a specific, contemporary context (health, education, careers, literature, history, family, relationships, and environment being common themes).  Thus, the students strive to refine their skills in writing, reading, speaking, and understanding spoken Spanish.  Students concentrate on developing proficiency in such skills, specifically in preparation for the AP Spanish Language examination. In addition, this course will emphasize mastery of linguistic competencies at a very high level of proficiency.

Despite the best attempts by the College Board, the AP Spanish Language curriculum is very fluid. Individual teachers can choose to present as much or as little information as they wish. Because teachers inherently have different methods of pedagogy, issues arise that pertain to the necessity of a standardized Spanish curriculum for the exam. Because the Spanish language is so eclectic and can be tested in a plethora of manners, a more solidified curriculum covering specific vocabulary, verb forms and usages, expressions, and other facets of the language may be required in the future.

While some students may be concerned about their ability to demonstrate proficiency in an assessment that native speakers of Spanish also take, only the scores of students who study Spanish as a second language are factored when creating the distribution curve of scores 1–5.  Native speakers or heritage language speakers of Spanish are then compared to non-native distribution and assigned a score accordingly.

There are 6 AP themes, Families and Communities, Personal and Public Identities, Contemporary Life, Beauty and Aesthetics, Science and Technology, and World Challenges.

Each AP Theme have 6-7 contexts. In the AP Theme of Families and Communities they have 6 contexts they are, Traditions and Values, Structure of Families, Social Media, Human Geography, Global Citizenship, and Educational Communities. For Personal and Public Identities they have 6 contexts, Personal Beliefs, Personal Interests, Self-esteem, Alienation and Assimilation, Heroes and Historical Characters, and National and Ethnic Identities. In Contemporary Life they have 7 contexts, Education and Professional Careers, Entertainment and Fun, Travel and Leisure, Lifestyles, Personal Relationships, Traditions and Social Values, and Voluntary Work. For Beauty and Aesthetics has 6 contexts, Architecture, Definitions of Beauty and Creativity, Fashion and Design, Language and Literature, and Visual and Scenic Arts. In Science and Technology they have 6 contexts, Access to Technology, Effects of Technology on the Individual and in Society, Health Care and Medicine, Technological Innovations, Natural Phenomena, Science and Ethics. In World Challenges they have 6 contexts, Economic Themes, Environmental Issues, Philosophical Thinking and Religion, Population and Demographics, Social Welfare, and Social Conscience/Awareness.

The exam
As of May 2017, the exam, normally administered on a Tuesday morning in May, is divided into two sections with multiple parts each. Section One, Part A contains sections of reading comprehension, in which students read four different passages and then answer multiple-choice questions about them. This section is 40 minutes.

Section One, Part B contains readings with audio accompaniment and asks students multiple-choice questions to compare and contrast the two as well as synthesize each one individually. Section three contains audio presentations of approximately three minutes and has multiple-choice questions. The two sections combined are allotted 55 minutes.

In Section Two, Part A: Email Response, students respond to a formal e-mail with a short response and ask questions to the author. This section is 15 minutes.

In Section Two, Part A: Argumentative Essay, is a formal writing component takes the shape of a document-based question. Students must use two sources as well as listen to a recording to give a written answer to the question.

Section Two, Part B: Interpersonal Speaking, is an informal or formal speaking section, where students are expected to interact to a recorded dialogue, during which they have 20 seconds to answer each section.

Section Two, Part B: Presentational Speaking, asks students to give a formal oral presentation with a cultural comparison document and have four minutes to prepare and two minutes to record.

The test is approximately  hours in length.

Note: As of 2017, all audio responses must be digitally submitted online as a mp3 file. CD players are no longer accepted.

Grade distribution
Both tables range from 2014 and beyond since that is the last time the AP Spanish course and exam were changed.

The table below is the grade distribution combining both the native speakers and Standard Group:

The table below is the grade distribution from the Standard Group:

References

Spanish-language education
Advanced Placement